Auximobasis liberatella is a moth in the family Blastobasidae. It was described by Francis Walker in 1864. It is found in Brazil (Ega).

References

Blastobasidae
Moths described in 1864